"The Earth is Dancing" (in Slovene: "Zemlja pleše") is a 1962 pop song, music of which was written by Mojmir Sepe based on a lyrics by Slovene poet Gregor Strniša that was awarded at the first edition of the Slovenian song festival where it was sung by a notable singer Marijana Držaj. The song became an evergreen, a popular and enduring example of Slovenian popular music. It has been since then released in a number of re-mixes. It also inspired one of the first musical videospots made in 1980s in Slovenia, at the time part of Yugoslavia, where both the videospot and the song were also popular.

The 1980s remake and videospot
In 1986, the song was remade in synthpop style by a Slovenian teenage group Videosex and sung by singer Anja Rupel. The remake inspired Max Marijan Osole, one of the first videomakers in Slovenia, to make a musical videospot with a 1980s computer animated background.

References

External links
lyrics with translations
Videospot of the 1980s remake with computer animated background

Slovenian songs
1962 songs